The Statue of Emilia Pardo Bazán is an instance of public art in Madrid, Spain. Located next to the calle de la Princesa, it is dedicated to Emilia Pardo Bazán.

History and description 
The costs were funded—under the auspice of María del Rosario de Silva, the Duchess of Alba—via popular subscription from women from Spain and Argentina.

Erected next to the Palacio de Liria and close to Pardo Bazán's Madrilenian address at the calle de la Princesa, the monument was unveiled on 24 June 1926. The ceremony of inauguration was presided by King Alfonso XIII and Victoria Eugenie. Romanones, Blanca de Igual y Martínez Dabán (viscountess of Llanteno and Madrid municipal councillor) and Eduardo Callejo de la Cuesta (Minister of Public Instruction), intervened as speakers.

In March 2019, the district junta of Centro voted to name the surrounding gardens as Jardines de las Feministas ("Gardens of the Feminists").

References 
Citations

Bibliography
 
 
 

Monuments and memorials in Madrid
Outdoor sculptures in Madrid
Sculptures of women in Spain
Pardo Bazan, Emilia
Buildings and structures in Universidad neighborhood, Madrid
1920s sculptures
Statues of writers
Stone sculptures in Spain
Monuments and memorials to women